Leucoptera smilactis is a moth in the Lyonetiidae family that is known from Japan (Honshu, Kyushu).

Adults are on wing from the end of June and from the beginning to the end of August. Larvae of the autumn generation spin a cocoon at the beginning of November and hibernate. The adults appear in May of the following year. There are three generations per year.

The larvae feed on Smilax china. They mine the leaves of their host plant. The mine has the form of an orthogenous upper surface blotch mine. It is pale greenish-brown with a central brown patch. Pupation takes place outside of the mine in a shining white cocoon, which can be found on the surface of a leaf or a twig. The spindle-shaped cocoon is covered by a H-shaped silken roof, but the cocoon spun on the twig has no silken roof.

External links

Lyonetiidae
Moths described in 1964
Endemic fauna of Japan
Moths of Japan